Wangwusaurus is extinct genus of probable therapsid that lived in the Late Permian in present-day China. Only species is known,  Wangwusaurus tayuensis, described by the paleontologist Yang Zhongjian in 1979 from seventeen teeth found in the Jiyuan formation, of which at least seven are recognized as not belonging to those of therapsids.

Description 
One of the teeth found also has characteristics similar to those of gorgonopsians, which earned the chinese paleontologist Yang Zhongjian to classify him as the first member of this group to have lived outside of Russia and Africa, places where they are officially recognized.
However, three years later, in 1981, palaeontologists Denise Sigogneau-Russell and Ai-Lin Sun found the assigned material to be a random assemblage of which only two have even a remote similarity to gorgonopsians, making its classification uncertain.

See also

 List of therapsids

References

 The main groups of non-mammalian synapsids at Mikko's Phylogeny Archive

Prehistoric synapsid genera
Lopingian synapsids of Asia
Prehistoric synapsids of Asia
Fossil taxa described in 1979
Taxa named by Yang Zhongjian
Nomina dubia
Incertae sedis
Therapsids